Muigima is a village in Ancuabe District in Cabo Delgado Province in northeastern Mozambique.

It is located southwest of the district capital of Ancuabe.

Transport

References

External links  
 Satellite map at Maplandia.com

Populated places in Ancuabe District